released outside Japan as Shin Megami Tensei: Persona 3, is a 2006 role-playing video game developed by Atlus. It is the fourth main installment in the Persona series, which is part of the larger Megami Tensei franchise. Atlus originally released the game for the PlayStation 2 in Japan in July 2006; the North American release of the game was delayed until 2007 due to issues with the publication of the official art book. Persona 3 FES, an extended version containing a new playable epilogue among other changes, was released in Japan in 2007 and worldwide the following year.

In Persona 3, the player takes the role of a high-school student who joins the Specialized Extracurricular Execution Squad (SEES), a group of students investigating the Dark Hour, a time period between one day and the next that few people are aware of. During the Dark Hour, the player enters Tartarus, a large tower containing Shadows, creatures that feed on the minds of humans. To fight the Shadows, each SEES member can summon a Persona, a manifestation of a person's inner self. The game's most iconic feature is how the members of SEES release their Personas: by firing a gun-like object called an Evoker at their head. In addition to the standard elements of role-playing games, Persona 3 includes elements of simulation games, as the game's protagonist progresses day by day through a school year, making friends and forming relationships that improve the strength of his Personas in battle.

The reception of Persona 3 was mainly positive; critics enjoyed its social elements, while some found its combat and environments repetitive. Persona 3 FES epilogue was said to give narrative closure to the original game, although it was criticized for not featuring the simulation aspect of Persona 3. An abridged PlayStation Portable version, Persona 3 Portable, was released in Japan in November 2009, in North America in July 2010, and in Europe in April 2011. This version added the ability to play as a female protagonist, new story elements and music, and a new interface. Portable was also released for Nintendo Switch, PlayStation 4, Windows, Xbox One, and Xbox Series X/S in 2023. Two fighting games that continue the story of SEES, Persona 4 Arena and Persona 4 Arena Ultimax, were released in the early 2010s. Persona 3 has also seen other related media released, including a rhythm game, multiple soundtrack albums, musical concerts, radio dramas, a manga, an anime series, and an episodic animated film series.

Gameplay

Persona 3 combines elements of traditional role-playing games and simulation games. The game follows the protagonist character, balancing their daily lives of going to school and building relationships with other people with fighting evil beings known as Shadows during the mysterious Dark Hour. Each day is divided between various time zones, the most common of which are "After School/Daytime" and "Evening." Except for scripted events, such as plot progression or special events, the player is free to choose how each day is spent, with most activities causing time to pass on. The types of activities and characters that can be interacted with vary depending on the day of the week and time of day. Additionally, some activities are limited by the protagonist's three attributes; Academics, Charm, and Courage, which can be built by performing various activities or making certain correct choices. During the evening, players can choose to visit Tartarus, the game's main dungeon, where they can build their party's experience and gain new items. On the day of the full moon, players will participate in a boss battle to progress the story.

Personas and social links
The main element of the game are the Personas, various creatures, and monsters which are associated with the Major Arcana of the Tarot. Each Persona has its own set of strengths and weaknesses and possesses various abilities, ranging from offensive and support abilities to passive abilities that support the character. Whereas each of the game's main characters has their own Persona, some of which change form as the story progresses, the protagonist is capable of wielding multiple Personas, which can be switched between battles. New Personas can be created by visiting the Velvet Room and fusing together multiple Personas, passing along certain moves from the Personas used. The current level of the protagonist limits the Personas that a player can create. Personas can also be obtained from Shuffle Time following battles, and previously obtained Personas can be summoned from the Persona Compendium for a fee. The Velvet Room additionally allows players to take on quests, such as retrieving certain items, in order to obtain a reward.

New to the series are  bonds that are formed with several of the game's characters, with each social link representing a specific Major Arcana. By spending time with these characters, these social links increase in rank. When creating a Persona of a particular Arcana, an experience bonus is granted if that Arcana possesses a social link, with greater bonuses awarded depending on the rank. Carrying a Persona of a respective Arcana can help bring a social link closer to increasing in Rank. Maxing out a social link gives players the ability to create specific Personas of each Arcana. Conversely, negative actions, such as incorrect dialogue choices or dating multiple characters (cheating), can result in a reversed social link, preventing players from summoning Personas of that Arcana until fixed. In the worst-case scenario, a reversed social link can break, effectively removing all Personas of that Arcana from the game.

Tartarus and combat

Tartarus is the game's main dungeon, which can be visited during the evening, provided the conditions allow it (e.g. the absence of some characters may prevent the player from visiting Tartarus that night). The player may order the other party members to split up to explore the area, or automatically attack Shadows on sight. Players will eventually come across boss floors, in which the player must defeat powerful Shadows to continue their progress. Additionally, certain floors halt further progress through the tower until the story progresses. Occasionally, innocent civilians will wander into Tartarus, winding up on certain floors. Rescuing these civilians safely before a full moon appears grants bonus rewards obtained from the police station. Spending too much time in Tartarus may cause characters to become "Tired" or "Sick," which can affect their performance during battle. Additionally, if the protagonist becomes Tired or Sick, some activities, such as studying at night, may be hampered. Players can recover their status by taking certain items, visiting the infirmary, or going to bed early.

Battle occurs when the player comes into contact with a Shadow roaming the floor, with the battle party consisting of whoever is nearby. Attacking the Shadow without being noticed will give the player an advantage, whilst the enemy gains an advantage if the player is attacked first. Battles use the "Press Turn" system, in which both allies and enemies take turns to attack using weapons, items, or Persona abilities. Using the Tactics option, the player can assign specific battle AI to each party member (in Persona 3 Portable, they may also choose to issue direct commands). Offensive attacks are divided into three physical types; Strike, Slash, and Pierce, and six elements; Fire, Ice, Electricity, Wind, Light, and Dark, attributes of which both Personas and Shadows may possess strengths and weaknesses against. Physical abilities use up HP whilst elemental and support magic use SP. By exploiting an enemy's weakness or performing a critical attack, characters can knock the opponent down, granting that character an extra turn. However, enemies can also take advantage of an ally's weakness to gain an additional turn. If the player manages to knock all opponents down, they may be granted the opportunity to perform an All-Out Attack, in which all able party members assault the enemies for massive damage. Allies who lose all of their HP can be revived using revival items and abilities, but the game will end if the protagonist loses all of their HP.

When a battle is won, players gain experience points that are divided amongst the party members. Earning enough experience allows Personas to increase in level, granting improved stats and new abilities. Some Personas may also grant Skill Cards, which can be given to other Personas to teach them new abilities. In addition, raising the protagonist's level will allow higher-level Personas to be summoned in the Velvet Room and allow the player to carry more Personas. At the end of certain battles, a minigame known as Shuffle Time may appear, in which players select a card from a set that is shuffled around. These can grant bonuses, such as additional experience points, cash, restore health, or give the player new Personas. However, selecting a cursed card will cause an extremely powerful monster, Death or better known as the Reaper, to appear on the current floor.

Story

Setting
The story of Persona 3 takes place in 2009 and is set in a Japanese city called  built and funded by the Kirijo Corporation. Several experiments carried out ten years ago created the  a period of time that exists between one day and the next. During this time, most people turned into coffins, and they are not aware of the Dark Hour; however, there is a select group of people who are. The Dark Hour bends reality; Gekkoukan High School, where most of the characters attend school during the day, becomes a huge labyrinthine tower called Tartarus, and beasts known as Shadows roam the area, preying on the minds of those still conscious. The Shadows leave their victims in near-catatonic states outside of the Dark Hour. To investigate and learn about the Dark Hour, Shadows, and Tartarus, the "Specialized Extracurricular Execution Squad," or SEES, was created. SEES is a group of high-schoolers capable of summoning beings known as Personas to combat Shadows. The Persona 3 instruction manual describes Persona's being "a second soul that dwells deep within a person's heart. It is an entirely different personality that emerges when a person is confronted with something from outside this world." Persona-users usually summon their Persona by firing a gun-like object called an Evoker at their head. An effect that appears to be broken glass comes from the user's head when the Evoker is used.

Characters

The main character of Persona 3 is a silent protagonist named by the player at the start of the game. He is a teenage boy, orphaned as a child, returning to the city he grew up in ten years before attending Gekkoukan High School. After learning of his ability to summon a Persona, he joins SEES, which is composed of students at his school: Yukari Takeba, a popular, cheerful girl; Akihiko Sanada, a calm and collected senior who leads the school's boxing team; and Mitsuru Kirijo, the Student Council President and daughter of the head of the Kirijo Group, who provides backup during battle. As the game progresses, SEES gains several new members: Junpei Iori, a class clown and the protagonist's best friend; Fuuka Yamagishi, a shy girl who replaces Mitsuru as a support character; Aigis, a female android designed by the Kirijo Group to fight Shadows; Ken Amada, an elementary schooler whose mother was killed by a Persona-user; Shinjiro Aragaki, a former member of SEES who quit due to past events; and Koromaru, a dog capable of summoning a Persona.

Plot

The Journey
Persona 3 begins on April 7, 2009, with the protagonist transferring to Gekkoukan High School and moving into a dorm in the city. After learning his ability to summon a Persona, he is asked to join SEES and is eventually elected as leader in combat. Additional members join SEES over time, all students attending Gekkoukan: Junpei, who had only recently discovered his ability to summon a Persona; Akihiko, whose arm injury prevented him from fighting; and Fuuka, who replaces Mitsuru as the team's support member. After awakening to his Persona ability, the protagonist is transported to the Velvet Room, which its proprietor, Igor, says is a realm between "dream and reality." Igor explains to him that his Persona ability is special: he is the only member of SEES capable of wielding multiple Personas in battle. In-game, the Velvet Room is where the player may fuse two or more Personas to create a new one. Igor also encourages the protagonist to meet people and form bonds with them, known as social links. According to Igor, the power of his social links will determine his potential in combat.

On nights when the moon is full, the city is attacked by a Shadow more powerful than the ones found in Tartarus. After several of these incidents, Mitsuru is forced to reveal to the team the origin of Tartarus and the Dark Hour. Ten years earlier, the Kirijo Group, a research company founded by Mitsuru's grandfather, began amassing and containing Shadows. They studied and performed experiments on them to harness their power. However, the experiments went awry, allowing the Shadows to escape and assemble into twelve larger creatures. Each is affiliated with one of the twelve Major Arcana. SEES' leader, Shuji Ikutsuki, informs them that if they were to defeat all twelve of the greater Shadows, Tartarus and the Dark Hour would disappear forever.

As the year continues, the group adds two more Persona-users to their team: Ken and Koromaru. While vacationing in Yakushima, Junpei, Akihiko, and the protagonist encounter Aigis, who had recently escaped the laboratory where she was kept, despite being deactivated for years. For reasons she cannot explain, she has a need to be near the protagonist, even breaking into his dorm room at night to monitor him. Aigis is also enlisted in SEES. After defeating the twelfth and final Shadow, SEES learns that Shuji Ikutsuki had misled them. By destroying the greater Shadows, they have freed parts of a being known as Nyx, which will bring about the end of the world if it is fully restored. Nyx, or the "maternal being," is the creator of Shadows; she is drawn to Earth by The Appriser, or "Death," a Shadow of the Death arcanum. SEES encounters The Appriser disguised as Ryoji Mochizuki, a recent transfer student to Gekkoukan High School.

The Shadow experiments performed ten years earlier created the Death Shadow, albeit in an incomplete state. Aigis, unable to defeat the Shadow, sealed it inside the protagonist, who was a child at the time. By defeating the twelve greater Shadows, the Death Shadow was recreated. Its purpose is to usher Nyx into the world, which will bring about the extinction of all life on Earth. Ryoji insists that Nyx cannot be defeated; however, he offers SEES an alternative. If they were to kill him, their memories of the Dark Hour and Tartarus would vanish, allowing them to continue life unaware of their impending death. Aigis, who now realizes why she wanted to protect the protagonist, begins to believe that she is useless. She urges SEES to kill Ryoji, as they cannot defeat Nyx. Through encouragement from her friends, however, she gains the resolve to join with SEES as they attempt to fight Nyx.

On December 31, New Year's Eve, the player must decide whether to kill Ryoji or spare his life. If the protagonist kills him, the game cuts to Graduation Day, with the entirety of SEES (barring Aigis) losing their memories of the Dark Hour and the Shadows, ending on a dark note as they prepare to celebrate in blissful ignorance until Nyx inevitably brings about The Fall and all of humanity dies. If he is spared, then the game continues, and on January 31, SEES ascends to the roof of Tartarus to face Ryoji, who has transformed into the Nyx Avatar. While they can defeat him, Nyx continues to descend to Earth. As this is happening, the protagonist is summoned to the Velvet Room, where Igor reminds him that the power of his social links would determine his potential. The protagonist hears the voices of his friends encouraging him. The strength of his social links grants him the power of the "Universe," allowing him to seal away Nyx from humanity. The world returns to normal, although defeating Ryoji has resulted in their memories of the past year related to the Dark Hour being lost to the members of SEES. However, Aigis and the protagonist do remember. On Graduation Day, the two go to the school's roof, where the members of SEES had promised to meet should they stop Nyx and live to see their graduation. As Mitsuru gives her graduation speech, she and the rest of SEES suddenly regain their memories, and the group rushes to the roof to fulfill the promise they all made. As the protagonist lies on Aigis' lap, she thanks the protagonist for giving her a purpose in life: protecting him. The protagonist, who has been feeling tired and unwell, then closes his eyes.

The Answer
The events of The Answer begin on March 31, shortly after the end of the original game. During the opening sequence, it is revealed that the protagonist has died, never waking up after closing his eyes at the end of the original game; the other characters speculate that his death is related to him defeating Nyx. The school year has ended, and the dorm is to be closed down soon. Aigis reveals to the group that she will not be attending school next year. During their last dinner party, the SEES members discover that they are trapped in their dorm and that the day March 31 is repeating itself. Later, a large door-like hole opens in the dorm floor, and SEES is attacked by Metis, an anti-shadow weapon similar to Aigis. In the midst of fighting Metis to protect her friends, Aigis's Persona, Athena, transforms into Orpheus, the original Persona of the protagonist. She also gains the protagonist's Wild Card ability. Aigis can subdue Metis, whose actions were an attempt to end the time skip and save Aigis, who she calls her "sister."

Underneath the dorm is the Abyss of Time, the cause of the time skip. The Abyss contains seven doors, the insides of which contain multi-floor dungeons, similar in design to Tartarus; in these areas, the game's combat occurs. At the bottom of each dungeon, the characters witness an event from the past of a member of SEES. After seeing several of these flashbacks, the characters discern that the event shown in each door relates to how that person had awakened to their Persona. At the bottom of the seventh and final door, SEES fights a Shadow-like version of the protagonist. After defeating it, each of them obtains a key. By combining the keys, they would be able to end the time skip and leave the dorm. However, Metis presents SEES with an alternative: instead of unlocking the front door of the dorm, they may also use the keys to travel back in time, to before the fight against Nyx and the death of the protagonist. Now unable to agree on how to use the keys, the characters determine that they must fight each other to decide; Yukari and Mitsuru wish to travel back in time and save the protagonist from his fate, Akihiko and Ken wish to honor his sacrifice and leave the dorm, while Junpei and Koromaru intend to act as a neutral party and hold the keys until the others can make a rational decision. Aigis, Fuuka, and Metis claim all eight keys, which fuse into the Final Key. After debating on what to do now, they discover a third, new door in the Abyss of Time, which the group uses (without the Final Key) to travel to the moment the protagonist sealed Nyx from the world.

Metis explains that the purpose of the seal created by the protagonist was not to seal away Nyx herself (who is not inherently evil) but to prevent humanity's despair from calling out to Nyx and bringing about the Fall once more. The subconscious will of humankind to despair and wish for death constantly rebirths a monster called Erebus that summons Nyx to destroy the world; Metis implies that Erebus's contact with Nyx is what caused the Fall (that was prevented by SEES). SEES realizes that the wishes that created Erebus also came from them, and so they fight it and can defeat it. Mitsuru points out that Erebus will return, as humans will never stop wishing for death. After breaking the time skip and exiting through the front door of the dorm with the Final Key, Metis, Aigis, and the rest of SEES are summoned to the Velvet Room, much to Igor's surprise. It is here they learn of Metis's true origins: that she is a manifestation of a part of Aigis's personality. Distraught over the protagonist's death, she no longer wanted to live like a human and wished to return to being a machine. However, after being set free from the Abyss of Time, Aigis changes her mind, deciding to continue to attend school, something she had chosen not to do earlier. Furthermore, the members of SEES decide to make the best out of their lives in order to honor and respect the protagonist's burden.

Development

Persona 3 began development in 2003, after the completion of Shin Megami Tensei: Nocturne and Digital Devil Saga. In March 2006, the first details on Persona 3 were unveiled in the Japanese gaming magazine Famitsū. In addition to announcing the game's Japanese release date of July 13, the three-page article detailed the game's premise, combat systems, and the social link system (known as "community" in the Japanese version). It also profiled three characters—the protagonist, Junpei, and Yukari—as well as their respective Personas: Orpheus, Hermes and Io.

The main character artist and art director for Persona 3 was Shigenori Soejima. The previous Persona titles' character artist, Kazuma Kaneko, gave the job to Soejima so he could gain more experience. Soejima felt a degree of pressure when designing the characters as he did not want to disappoint the series' fanbase. The goal was to make players of the Megami Tensei series feel gratified that they had supported the Persona series. In an interview, Soejima compared the game's aesthetic and style to a fantastical manga, citing its use of mecha-like Persona and Mitsuru's flamboyant styling. Soejima returned to design the character Metis for FES. The user interface was designed to stand out during the game's marketing, with its blue-colored design intended to evoke a cool and stylish atmosphere. The anime cutscenes for Persona 3 and FES were animated by animation production company Point Pictures.

In an interview with the magazine Play, lead director for Persona 3 Katsura Hashino discussed why the decision was made to have party members be directed by an artificial intelligence: "I think it's more fun to have the party members controlled by their AI, so each member's characteristics and personality are on vivid display. There were no objections raised among the Persona 3 development team, either." He also notes that the system "wasn't well received" by players of the game. Later, the use of AI for the secondary party members was described as a stylistic choice representing the game's theme of conquering the fear of death through "bonds": each character was their own person, and the player could only influence things by interacting with them. Persona 3 does not include the negotiation elements of previous Persona or Megami Tensei games, which allowed players to talk to enemies during a battle to recruit them, earn money, or obtain items. However, the social elements of Persona 3 (and its successor, Persona 4) are considered the equivalent of the negotiation system by the development team. Maragos said in a 1UP.com interview that "negotiation isn't gone...And [it] still factors into Persona Fusion; it's still a big part of the game. I feel like it's disguised, but it's there."

Localization
The localization of Persona 3 was handled by Yu Namba and Nich Maragos. During this process, the team worked to leave as much of the original Japanese content intact, continuing a trend started with Persona 2: Eternal Punishment. One of the ideas had by the team for Persona 3 was to use it as a medium for introducing Japanese culture to a western audience. While localizing Persona 3 for English-speaking countries, the honorifics used by the characters in the original Japanese script were retained. According to Maragos, their use "[added] so much more meaning to the text". In an interview with RPGamer, project editor Yu Namba explained that during the process of translation, some of the Japanese humor, "things that made absolutely no sense in western culture…were replaced with jokes that at least somewhat parallel the originals." One of the changes that needed to be made was to the school tests, which were based around questions on the English language. A similar change was Mitsuru's second language: in the original version it was English, but for the localized version her second language was changed to French. This choice was influenced by her cultured appearance. In addition, in-game references to the original Shin Megami Tensei were altered to references to Persona 2.

Music
The original soundtrack for Persona 3 was composed entirely by Shoji Meguro, with the sole exception of "Adventured Act", which was composed by Yosuke Uda. It was released as a two disc soundtrack in Japan by Aniplex on July 19, 2006. A selection of tracks from the full soundtrack was bundled with the North American release of the game. An arranged album, titled Burn My Dread -Reincarnation: Persona 3-, was also released in Japan by Aniplex on April 18, 2007. It contains eleven arrangements of tracks from Persona 3, as well as an extended version of the song "Burn My Dread." Meguro stated that the development of Persona 3 was one of his first opportunities to fully realize his music in video games. The soundtrack features a high use of vocals, though Meguro did not consider this as special or exceptional. A tune from previous Persona titles he rearranged was "Aria of the Soul", the theme of the Velvet Room. The game's battle theme, "Mass Destruction", was originally just a prototype, but the reception to it was so positive that it went into the final game. In the past, the hardware limitations of the original PlayStation required him to compose music in 100-200 kilobyte samples, which he felt made the music sound "pretty cheap". The move to the PlayStation 2 allowed for real-time streaming of music. Meguro considers this "the point at which [he] was finally able to express [his] music without making any compromises". He was also worried about the pronunciation of the English lyrics.

Meguro returned to compose new music for Persona 3:FES. Released in Japan by Aniplex on May 3, 2007, the soundtrack contained the original score for FES, as well as arrangements of music from earlier games in the Persona series. "The Snow Queen", composed by Kenichi Tsuchiya, is a remix of the theme in Revelations: Persona. "Maya's Theme", composed by Kenichi Tsuchiya, and "Time Castle", composed by Toshiko Tasaki, are remixes of tracks from Persona 2: Innocent Sin. Persona 3 Portable contains new background music, which can be heard if the player chooses to control the game's new female protagonist. The game's official soundtrack was released in Japan by Aniplex on November 25, 2009.

Promotion and release
The North American release of Persona 3 shipped as a collector's edition box containing the game, a soundtrack disc, and a 52-page art book. The game was originally scheduled to release on July 24, 2007. However, Atlus encountered a problem with manufacturing the artbook several days before the intended ship date. Instead of shipping the game without the book, the company decided to push its release back three weeks, to August 14. Atlus issued a press release explaining that they were delaying the game to maintain the quality of the package, which would have been "irreparably compromised" if they had "revise[d] or abandon[ed] the deluxe package."

Persona 3 FES
 is an add-on disc for Persona 3 containing updates to the original game, as well as a new epilogue in which the player controls Aigis. FES was released in Japan on April 19, 2007, as both a stand-alone game and the "director's cut" version of Persona 3. Overseas, the combined edition was published in North America by Atlus USA on April 22, 2008, and in Europe by Koei on October 17, 2008. According to the game's director, Katsura Hashino, the subtitle "Fes" is derived from the word "festival". This version of the game was re-released as a PS2 Classic on PSN for the PlayStation 3 in 2012. Players of the original Persona 3 are given the option of transferring certain data from the original version's save file, such as the player's compendium, social-related stats, and maxed social link items.

Persona 3 FES was first released alongside the original game in two forms: the "Regular Edition" — containing both the "director's cut" version of Persona 3, and the new epilogue — as two separate discs, and the "Append Edition", containing only the epilogue, on a single disc. Persona 3 and its expansion were released simultaneously in Japan on April 19, 2007. At the time, Atlus had not announced plans to release FES outside Japan. This announcement did not come until February 2008, when the game's North American release date was revealed to be April 22, 2008. An exclusive Amazon.com limited edition bundle was released on November 28, 2008, containing Art of Persona 3 artbook, Persona 3 soundtrack disc and the FES edition in a cardboard sleeve. The FES edition of the game was also released on PSN on April 10, 2012.

The expansion to Persona 3, in addition to adding new content to the main game (referred to as "The Journey," or "Episode Yourself" in the Japanese version), includes an epilogue to the original story titled "The Answer" ("Episode Aegis" in the Japanese version). The core gameplay of The Answer is similar to that of The Journey, although the social link system has been removed, and the player does not attend school.

Persona 3 Portable
, an enhanced port of Persona 3 for the PlayStation Portable, was released in Japan on November 1, 2009, and released in North America on July 6, 2010. It came out to most of Europe on April 29, 2011, and the UK on April 28, 2011. The announcement in Famitsū revealed that the player would have the option to play as a female protagonist. This selection alters some aspects of the story: the first Persona gained by the protagonist, Orpheus, has a different appearance; Igor's assistant in the Velvet Room, Elizabeth, can be replaced with a male equivalent named Theodore. The gender choice also alters some aspects of the social link stories. In addition to the new playable character, there are two new difficulty levels to select from alongside the original game's three. Persona 3 Portable only includes the story of the original Persona 3, otherwise referred to as "The Journey"; however, general changes have been made to the plot, regardless of character choice.

The game's revised battle system draws on elements added in Persona 3'''s successor, Persona 4. In combat, the player is able to directly control every character, as an alternative to utilizing the game's artificial intelligence. The ability to guard has been added, and allies will take fatal attacks for the protagonist, preventing their death. Outside of Tartarus, instead of navigating the game world by directly controlling the protagonist, the player guides an on-screen cursor around an area, allowing interaction with characters and objects. The game includes the voice acting of the original game, although characters are not shown in the world, instead being represented by on-screen portraits. In addition, the anime cutscenes seen in the original Persona 3 were replaced to feature in-game graphics. Shoji Meguro composed 10 new musical tracks for Persona 3 Portable; with the majority of them being written for the female protagonist's playthrough. Several cameos of characters from Persona 4 have been added to Persona 3 Portable, including Yukiko Amagi, a playable character from Persona 4. It also features a cameo from Vincent Brooks, the protagonist of Catherine.Persona 3 Portable was released as a stand-alone game and as part of a bundle package, which includes a T-shirt and desk calendar. The game on its own retails for 6,279 yen (US$68), while the bundle (known as Persona 3 Portable DX) sells for 8,495 yen (US$92). During the North American release, Atlus offered Junpei's hat as a pre-order bonus for purchasing "Persona 3 Portable".

Ports for Nintendo Switch, PlayStation 4, Windows, Xbox One, and Xbox Series X/S were released on January 19, 2023.

Reception

CriticsPersona 3 received positive reviews upon its release, earning a Metacritic score of 86. Shane Bettenhausen of 1UP.com called the game a "refreshingly new take on the MegaTen [Megami Tensei] concept", and "the best RPG hitting the PS2 this year." He praised the "excellent" AI created to direct the actions of party members during battle, which he felt created "the series' speediest and most dynamic battle system to date." Jeff Haynes from IGN criticized the system, finding that it would occasionally result in the death of the player's character, which causes a game over.GameTrailers called the game "a rare supernatural delicacy", stating it is an RPG that fans of the genre shouldn't miss out on. GameSpy Patrick Joynt praised the social elements of Persona 3, calling the game's social links "almost universally fascinating." While he suspected the simulation elements would "probably be the biggest hurdle" for fans of role-playing or Megami Tensei games, in his review, he wrote that he "can't stress enough how well-done it is." Heidi Kemps of GamesRadar found the game's teenage themes to be "a refreshing change" from those of other games in the genre, as they touch on "the social awkwardness common at that point in life." Game Informers Joe Juba found the game's environments to be weak, as "most of the game takes place within one tower [Tartarus]." In his review, he also noted that the game's roots in the Megami Tensei series would come across as foreign to new players. "If you don't know anything about fusing Personas, or simply that 'bufu' means 'ice attack,' you have some catching up to do."Persona 3: FES received a score of 89 on Metacritic, slightly higher than that of Persona 3. The plot of The Answer provides "much-needed narrative closure" to the story of The Journey, according to Shane Bettenhausen. Kevin VanOrd called FES a "wonderfully enhanced version of an already-great RPG"; in his review, he recommends the game to new players and those who had already finished the original game. The gameplay of The Answer was criticized by several reviewers for not including the social elements of the original game. VanOrd found the new chapter to be "less interesting" because of this. Jeff Haynes commented that the change "harkens back to a classic, more hardcore RPG experience of fighting and grinding", while done at the expense of what "made Persona 3 so intriguing in the first place." The reviews of GameSpy and IGN reiterated issues found with the original game, such as the inability to directly control party members in battle.

While some critics like IGN criticized Persona 3 Portable for "losing some of its polish", it was as acclaimed as FES, receiving an 89 out of 100 from Metacritic, making it the third best reviewed PSP game on the website. It was praised for, despite having been released twice already, being an adventure worth playing again. This was echoed by GamesRadar, IGN, 1UP.com and GamePro. One of the reviewers from Famitsu wrote that the remake includes "enough differences in the Social Links to make it fun even for old players.", and perfect scores from websites such as Destructoid and GamePro. GameTrailers went on to nominate the game for "Best PSP Game" in their awards, losing to God of War: Ghost of Sparta and "Best RPG", losing to Mass Effect 2. Three websites specific to coverage of RPGs honored it in annual award postings, namely RPGamer (Best Re-release), RPGFan (Best Traditional RPG on Handheld), and RPGLand (Best Port).

Shane Bettenhausen considered the inclusion of Evokers "a ballsy and shocking move" on the part of Atlus, but felt their inclusion created "an edgy sensibility that fits perfectly with the overall dark tone" of the game. Similarly, Joe Juba thought the concept fit "perfectly" with the game's "dark tone". Jeff Haynes found the animations of characters using their Evokers to be "intriguing and shocking at the same time". While previewing Persona 3 for GameSpot, Kevin VanOrd said that the continued use of Evokers "never gets old and it never gets any less awesome to watch, and considering that you could play this for fifty, sixty, seventy, eighty hours or more, that's saying something." Atlus USA did not remove the Evokers from Persona 3 for its worldwide release, despite the possible controversy. Nich Maragos from the localization team said on 1UP.coms Retronauts podcast that the company did not receive any criticism for their inclusion. "There was never any Jack Thompson-ing…we didn't get any letters from concerned parents."

The PC, PlayStation 4, Xbox Series X/S and Switch versions of Persona 3 Portable received "generally favorable reviews", according to Metacritic.

Sales and accoladesPersona 3 sold 127,472 copies in its first week and 210,319 copies overall in Japan by 2008. Persona 3 Portable sold over 158,000 copies in Japan within its first month of release.Persona 3 was named the best role-playing game of 2006 by Famitsu, and of 2007 by GameSpot and RPGFan. GameSpy gave the title its 2007 PS2 RPG of the Year award and placed it second in the 2007 PS2 Top 10 Games of the Year. IGN placed Persona 3 FES fifteenth in their feature "The Top 25 PS2 Games of All Time". 1UP.com 2007 game awards, which ran in the March 2008 issue of Electronic Gaming Monthly, included Persona 3, given the award for "Most controversial game that created no controversy". In 2010, Persona 3 was listed first on RPGamer "Top RPGs of the Decade" list, and second place in RPGFan "Top 20 RPGs of the Past Decade" list.Persona 3 was nominated for Best RPG at 2007 Spike Video Game Awards, but lost to Mass Effect.

Legacy
Spin-offs and tie-insPersona Q: Shadow of the Labyrinth is a dungeon crawler RPG developed for the Nintendo 3DS. It features both the characters from Persona 3 and the ones from Persona 4 and includes some gameplay elements from the Etrian Odyssey series. The Persona 3 campaign starts two weeks before October 4. Just as SEES prepares to enter Tartarus that night, they are pulled into the Velvet Room and sent to a school they have never seen before. While searching the area, they meet the amnesiacs Zen and Rei and the Investigation Team, the latter of whom have also been pulled into the strange school: they must now work together to escape. The game was released in Japan on June 5, 2014, North America on November 25, 2014, and Europe on November 28, 2014.

A rhythm game based on the setting and characters of Persona 3, titled Persona 3: Dancing in Moonlight, was released for the PlayStation 4 and PlayStation Vita in Japan in May 2018 and worldwide in December 2018, alongside Persona 5: Dancing in Starlight. Persona Q2: New Cinema Labyrinth serves as a sequel to Persona Q. The game was released for the Nintendo 3DS in Japan on November 29, 2018, and worldwide on June 4, 2019. The game retains the casts from Persona 3 and Persona 4, joined by the Phantom Thieves of Hearts from Persona 5 and the female protagonist from Persona 3 Portable.

Related media
Merchandise
Several figurines of the characters have been produced by Kotobukiya, a Japanese collectible toy company. They include the protagonist of the game, Aigis, Mitsuru, and Akihiko. The figurines have interchangeable parts, such as an Evoker or weapon, which can be stored in the base. Alter, another Japanese company that specializes in collectibles, has also released 1:8 scale figurines of Elizabeth, Aigis, and Mitsuru. The headphones worn by the protagonist are sold by Audio-Technica, model ATH-EM700(Japan-only version). Atlus collaborated with the Japanese publishing company Enterbrain to publish the game's multiple strategy guides and an artbook detailing character and setting designs.

Manga
A manga adaptation of Persona 3 written and illustrated by Shūji Sogabe was published monthly in the Japanese magazine Dengeki Maoh until it went on hiatus once Persona 4 was released. However, it began serialization again starting November 7, 2011, moving from Dengeki Maoh to Atlus's official Persona Magazine. As of February 2017, 11 volumes have been released.

Anime

A non-canonical spin-off anime to Persona 3 titled Persona: Trinity Soul aired in Japan starting in January 2008 and ran for twenty-six episodes. Taking place ten years after the events of the game, the anime features Akihiko as a secondary character. NIS America licensed the show and released it in two half-season deluxe edition box sets with the original Japanese audio track in 2010.

Films

In June 2012, it was announced that Persona 3 would receive a four-part film series adaptation. It was produced by AIC ASTA (first film) and A-1 Pictures (films two through four). The first film was directed by Noriaki Akitaya, the second and fourth by Tomohisa Taguchi, and the third by Keitaro Motonaga. The main Japanese voice actors from the original game reprised their roles in the film series.

Radio drama
Several series of radio dramas based on Persona 3 and Persona 3: FES have been released in Japan. Persona 3 Drama CD: A Certain Day of Summer features an original story voiced by the game's original cast. Persona 3 Drama CD Vol. 2 -Moonlight- links the story of Persona 3 and the epilogue released with Persona 3: FES. From February to June 2008, a series of character dramas were released as five CDs. The volumes respectively focus on the protagonist and Ryoji; Junpei and Chidori; Fuuka, Ken, and Aigis; Yukari and Mitsuru; and Akihiko, Shinjiro, and Koromaru. In early 2009, a two-volume side story about Mitsuru was released.

Stage productionPersona 3 was adapted into five live stage musicals, with the first one performed in 2014. The series of plays were first announced in August 2013 and were written by Kumagai and Kotora Kagurazuka, with music by Meguro. The plays included separate shows for both the male and female protagonists, who were named Sakuya Shiomi and Kotone Shiomi, and had minor dialogue and scenes unique to each protagonist. The plays starred Shouta Aoi as Sakuya, Kana Asumi as Kotone, Maho Tomita as Yukari, Genki Okawa as Junpei, Yuki Fujiwara as Akihiko, Asami Tano as Mitsuru, Marina Tanoue as Fuuka, ZAQ as Aigis, and Waku Sakaguchi and Tomonori Suzuki as Ken. The musicals were also broadcast live on Niconico and a behind-the-scenes special aired on Tokyo MX.

The first play, Persona 3: The Weird Masquerade: The Blue Awakening ran from January 8–12, 2014, at Theater G Rosso, and was given a home release on May 14, 2014. The Blue Awakening followed events up to Fuuka's inclusion into the party.The Blue Awakening was followed up with a sequel, Persona 3: The Weird Masquerade: The Ultramarine Labyrinth, which ran from September 16–24, 2014, at Theater 1010 and was given a home release on January 28, 2015. The play follows in-game events from July to early November. Richard Eisenbeis from Kotaku reviewed the play favorably, approving of its casting and special effects, but felt that the musical numbers were "out of place" and the protagonists had "zero personality."

A third musical, titled Persona 3: The Weird Masquerade: The Bismuth Crystals ran from June 5–13, 2015, and was given a home release on September 30, 2015. The fourth and fifth stage plays, Persona 3: The Weird Masquerade: Act 4: Indigo Pledge and Persona 3: The Weird Masquerade: Final Act: Beyond the Blue Sky, ran from April 14–23, 2017.

Notes

References

External links

  (FES)
  (Portable'')

2006 video games
Apocalypticism in fiction
Atlus games
Extinction in fiction
Fiction about sacrifices
Ghostlight games
High school-themed video games
Japanese role-playing video games
Koei games
Nintendo Switch games
Persona 3
PlayStation 2 games
PlayStation 4 games
PlayStation Network games
PlayStation Portable games
Role-playing video games
Seinen manga
Single-player video games
THQ games
Video games about amnesia
Video games about death
Video games based on Greek mythology
Video games developed in Japan
Persona 3 FES
Persona 3 Portable
Video games scored by Shoji Meguro
Video games set in 2009
Video games set in 2010
Video games set in Japan
Video games using procedural generation
Video games with alternate endings
Windows games
Works about death
Xbox One games
Xbox Series X and Series S games